Christopher David Naylor,  (born October 26, 1954) is a Canadian physician, medical researcher and former president of the University of Toronto. He is ICES scientist emeritus and founding CEO. In 2016, he was inducted into the Canadian Medical Hall of Fame.

Life and career
Naylor was born in Woodstock, Ontario. A Rhodes Scholar, Naylor received an MD from the University of Toronto in 1978, proceeding to Hertford College, Oxford, where he earned a D.Phil in 1983 in the Department of Social and Administrative Studies. His doctoral thesis was titled "The Canadian medical profession and state medical care insurance: Key developments, 1911-1966".

He completed work in internal medicine and clinical epidemiology at the University of Western Ontario and Toronto and joined the academic staff of the Faculty of Medicine at the University of Toronto in 1987 where his clinical base was at Sunnybrook Health Sciences Centre.

Naylor developed the proposal for the Institute for Clinical Evaluative Sciences in 1991 and served as the Institute's President and Chief Executive Officer from its inception in 1992 until June 1998.

Naylor was appointed Dean of Medicine and Vice Provost, Relations with Health Care Institutions, of the University of Toronto in 1999. While in this position, he was named Chair of the National Advisory Committee on SARS and Public Health, 2003, following the outbreak of SARS in Ontario.<ref name=sarsnaylor>{{cite book| url=http://www.phac-aspc.gc.ca/publicat/sars-sras/naylor/ |title=Learning from SARS - Renewal of Public Health in Canada. A report of the National Advisory Committee on SARS and Public Health October 2003. |date=8 November 2004 |publisher=Public Health Agency of Canada |access-date=2009-06-16}}</ref>

The appointment of Naylor as president of the University of Toronto was announced on 26 April 2005. He replaced acting president Vivek Goel who in turn had replaced interim president Frank Iacobucci, who himself took over after the departure of Robert Birgeneau. Naylor officially took office on October 1, 2005.

On July 25, 2006, it was announced that Naylor had been appointed an Officer of the Order of Canada. He was appointed on April 6, 2006, and his investiture took place on February 9, 2007.

On June 24, 2014, Naylor was appointed by Rona Ambrose, Minister of Health, as Chair of the Advisory Panel on Healthcare Innovation. The Panel's report, Unleashing Innovation: Excellence for Healthcare in Canada was delivered in July 2015.

In June 2016, Dr. Naylor was appointed the chair of The Advisory panel for the report INVESTING IN CANADA’S FUTURE: Strengthening the Foundations of Canadian Research'' by the federal Minister of Science, Dr. Kirsty Duncan.  The 280 page "Naylor Report"  was delivered in April 2017, and finally acted upon in the Canadian government's budget of February 27, 2018.

Legacy

In 2015, the erstwhile Tanz Building at the University of Toronto was renamed the C. David Naylor Building.

References

External links

1954 births
Living people
Alumni of Hertford College, Oxford
Canadian medical researchers
Canadian epidemiologists
Canadian Rhodes Scholars
Canadian university and college chief executives
Massey College, Toronto
Officers of the Order of Canada
People from Woodstock, Ontario
Presidents of the University of Toronto
University of Toronto alumni
Academic staff of the University of Toronto
Members of the National Academy of Medicine